Alistair Petrie (born 30 September 1970) is a British actor. He has starred in The Bank Job (2008), Cloud Atlas (2012), Rush (2013) and Rogue One: A Star Wars Story (2016). Petrie has also starred in the Channel 4 television series Utopia, the BBC One television series' The Night Manager, Sherlock, and Undercover and as Mr. Groff in the Netflix original comedy-drama series Sex Education.

Early life
Petrie was born 30 September 1970 in Catterick, North Riding of Yorkshire. He was brought up in the Middle East, mainland Europe and East Africa. His father was an RAF fighter pilot. 

He trained at the London Academy of Music and Dramatic Art.

Career

Theatre 
Petrie spent his early career in theatre around the country before joining the RSC where productions included Shakespeare's Troilus and Cressida and Henrik Ibsen's Brand opposite Ralph Fiennes. In 2005, he joined the National Theatre, where he stayed for 28 months performing in His Dark Materials, Shakespeare's Henry IV alongside Sir Michael Gambon and David Edgar's Playing With Fire. Other theatre work includes The Earl of Wessex in the 2015 West End Production of Shakespeare in Love. In 2008, Petrie played the lead role of Man in Mine, Shared Experience at the West Yorkshire Playhouse, Leeds.

Screen
In 1996, Petrie appeared as Robert Martin in Emma. He featured in the BBC production of The Forsyte Saga as George Forsyte in 2002-2003, and he played a brief role in the music video for "Bellissimo" by Ilya directed by the Guard Brothers in 2004. In 2007 he appeared in Marc Munden's The Mark of Cain, The Whistleblowers and Cranford. 

In 2009 he played Heaton in the film The Duchess, and in 2010 played Billing in the horror film Devil's Playground. Petrie appeared as Philip Lisle in The Bank Job, as Felix Finch in the 2012 film Cloud Atlas, as  Stirling Moss in Rush, and as General Davits Draven in Rogue One: A Star Wars Story.

Also in television, Petrie has portrayed Geoff in Channel 4's Utopia, Alexander "Sandy" Langbourne in The Night Manager, and Robert Greenlaw in BBC1's Undercover. He played the role of Major James Sholto in the second episode of Season 3 of the BBC TV series Sherlock, which aired on 5 January 2014. In 2018, he played Dr. Stephen Stanley in The Terror (based on the novel of the same name), a supernatural horror series about Franklin's lost expedition. In 2019, Petrie began playing Mr. Groff in the Netflix original comedy-drama series Sex Education.

Personal life
Petrie is married to actress Lucy Scott, with whom he has three sons.

Petrie is an Ambassador for Borne, a medical research charity looking to identify the causes of premature birth. In 2007, he and his wife swam the English Channel to fundraise for the charity, becoming the first married couple to complete the crossing.

Filmography

Film

Television

Video games

References

External links

Roxane Vacca Management - Alistair Petrie Profile

1970 births
20th-century English male actors
21st-century English male actors
English male film actors
English male television actors
Living people
Male actors from Yorkshire
People from Catterick, North Yorkshire